The cywydd (plural ) is one of the most important metrical forms in traditional Welsh poetry (cerdd dafod).

The first recorded examples of the cywydd date from the early 14th century, when it is believed to have been developed. This was the favourite metre of the Poets of the Nobility, the poets working from the fourteenth to the seventeenth centuries, and it is still used today.

The cywydd consists of a series of seven-syllable lines in rhyming couplets, with all lines written in cynghanedd. One of the lines must finish with a stressed syllable, while the other must finish with an unstressed syllable. The rhyme may vary from couplet to couplet, or may remain the same. There is no rule about how many couplets there must be in a cywydd.

The  and the related ,  and the  all occur in the list of the twenty four traditional Welsh poetic meters adopted in the later Middle Ages.

See also
 Englyn

References
 Meic Stephens, 1986, The Oxford Companion to the Literature of Wales, Oxford University Press.

Welsh poetry
Medieval Welsh literature
Welsh-language literature
Western medieval lyric forms
Poetic rhythm